Ateline gammaherpesvirus 3 (AtHV-3) is a species of virus in the genus Rhadinovirus, subfamily Gammaherpesvirinae, family Herpesviridae, and order Herpesvirales.

References 

Gammaherpesvirinae